Ernest Bush (1876–1930) was a Cardiff photographer best known for an extensive series of real photographic postcards of South Wales published during the Edwardian era. His cards covered many small settlements in the South Wales valleys as well as metropolitan centres such as Cardiff, Swansea and Newport. He was the official photographer for the 1909 National Pageant of Wales. He married Gertrude Howarth in 1914, the pair eventually moving to Blackpool to run the Marina Boarding establishment.

References

 
Welsh photographers
Postcard publishers
1930 deaths
1876 births